"She Likes It" is a song co-written and recorded by American country music singer Russell Dickerson. It is the lead single to his third studio album Russell Dickerson, and features guest vocals from Jake Scott.

Content 
Russell Dickerson was attending a writing session with Josh Kerr when Kerr suggested that Dickerson listen to music by Jake Scott, an independent country music singer. Because he liked the music, Dickerson then arranged for Scott to join in a songwriting session with the two. Because of the collaboration, Dickerson also chose to include Scott on the song as a backing vocalist. Josh Kerr also produced the track, which Billy Dukes of Taste of Country described as mixing influences of country with trap music.

On September 30, 2022, "She Likes It" was certified platinum by the Recording Industry Association of America (RIAA).

Chart performance 
It peaked at 16 on Country Airplay chart and 13 on the Hot Country Songs chart in late 2022, making it Dickerson's lowest peaking song to date on the former chart. Despite peaking at #63 on the Hot 100, "She Likes It" qualified for the 2022 year-end Hot 100, making it the lowest-peaking song ever to make the year-end chart, passing "Talk You Out of It" by Florida Georgia Line which peaked at #57.

Weekly charts

Year-end charts

Certifications

References 

2022 songs
2022 singles
Thirty Tigers singles
Russell Dickerson songs
Songs written by Russell Dickerson
Male vocal duets